Königerode is a village and a former municipality in the district of Harz, Saxony-Anhalt, Germany. Since 1 August 2009, it is part of the town Harzgerode.

References

Former municipalities in Saxony-Anhalt
Harzgerode